Neurophyseta normalis is a moth in the family Crambidae. It was described by George Hampson in 1912. It is found in the West Indies, including St. Vincent and Cuba.

References

Moths described in 1912
Musotiminae